Fiach Moriarty is an Irish singer-songwriter and television presenter from Dublin, Ireland. His debut album So I came out in 2010 which appeared in the Irish top 100 album chart and peaked at 62. His second record was released in April 2015 and debuted at number 29 in the Irish chart.

Early life
At the age of 5, Fiach Moriarty began to learn the violin at school in Inchicore. He states that he grew up with traditional Irish folk music in the home but was also influenced by Mozart and Beethoven, due to his mother's piano playing.
At the age of 12, he received his first guitar as a birthday gift and began writing songs, influenced by Nirvana and The Beatles.

Career 
In 2010, Moriarty released his debut record (released as 'Fiach') "So I" which appeared in the Irish top 100 album chart. He has performed on tour with Ray Davies, Mary Black, Eddi Reader, Damien Dempsey and Declan O'Rourke.
In 2015, Moriarty released his second record 'The Revolution', drawing on inspiration from the 1916 Easter Rising and World War 1.
For Christmas 2016, Fiach collaborated with John Byrne and Duncan Maitland, releasing a Christmas single; 'In Love at Christmas Time'.

In Autumn 2017, 'Jingle Jangle', a 6-episode musical travel show hosted by Fiach Moriarty, Jim Lockhart (Horslips) and Fiachna Ó Braonáin (Hothouse Flowers) aired on Irish television station be3 featuring Brian Kennedy (singer), Una Healy, Duke Special, Mundy and many more well-known Irish musicians.

In 2017, Moriarty lent his guitar and vocal skills live, in studio and on television to Damien Dempsey, ALDOC, Pauline Scanlon and Beoga

Moriarty's work has been praised by Eddi Reader, Paul Brady, and Chris White (musician) of The Zombies

In 2019, Fiach lent his voice as narrator to the Philip Lynott documentary, 'Scéalta ón Old Town', which aired on RTÉ 1

From 2019 to 2021 he was a member of The Late Late Show (Irish talk show) House band, performing every Friday on the world's longest running chat show.
His cover of Mr. Blue Sky by Electric Light Orchestra has been used in multiple videos on TikTok and has amassed in excess of 50 million views 

In 2022, it was announced that Fiach would be joining Horslips as lead guitarist for a run of gigs.

Discography 
 So i – (2010)
 Married to Music – (single) – (2013)
 The Revolution – (2015)
 In Love at Christmas Time (released as 'HoneyPie') – (2016)
 Mr. Blue Sky ('Degrees of Light' charity album) – (2017)
 “Everything Will Rhyme” (single) – (2019)

References

External links 
 Official Website

21st-century Irish male singers
Irish male singer-songwriters
Singers from Dublin (city)
Living people
Year of birth missing (living people)